Michel Armengot (born 16 September 1961), more commonly known as Art Mengo, is a French singer and songwriter. Though born in the Occitan city of Toulouse in France, he is of Spanish descent as his parents had fled from the Francoist State.

Biography

The beginnings
It is worth noting that Mengo was born with greatly diminished hearing. In fact, it was estimated by doctors that 70% of his hearing ability was missing. Despite this handicap, his mother gave him a keyboard as a plaything. It is now clear that this had an impact upon his future career. During his teenage years, corrective surgery for his ears helped him to regain his hearing ability. Music, however, was not Mengo's first career plan. Upon completing the baccalauréat, Mengo pursued chemistry and physics at university.

Music
Music initially was a hobby to Mengo as his studies came first. During his university years, Mengo would play piano at a local bar during the evenings. Mengo had purchased an 8 Track recorder, and this would play heavily into his move into the music industry. With Mengo writing the music, and his brother-in-law producing lyrics a considerable inventory of music was created. It was good enough for Mengo to get his first record contract in 1988, shortly thereafter he released his first single, "Les Parfums de sa vie (Je l'ai tant aimée)", which was a hit on the French Top 50. His music quickly became popular, and by 1992 he was asked to write a song for French superstar Johnny Hallyday, "Ça ne change pas un homme". In 1993, he wrote an entire album for German singer Ute Lemper. He performed the song "Parler d'amour" with Ute on this album.

Despite his successes, he remains relatively unknown.

Discography

Studio albums 

 Un 15 Août En Février (1990, CBS)
 Guerre D'Amour (1992, Columbia)
 La Mer N'Existe Pas (1995, Columbia)
 Croire Qu'Un Jour (1998, Columbia)
 La Vie De Château (2003, Polydor)
 Entre Mes Guillemets (2006, Polydor)
 Ce Petit Chemin (2012, L'autre Distribution 9311861)

Live album 

 Live Au Mandala (1998, Columbia)

Compilation 

 Les Parfums De Sa Vie: Le Meilleur (2001, Columbia) 1990–1998

External links

  Official website
RFI's Art Mengo page

1961 births
Living people
French male singers
French singer-songwriters
French people of Spanish descent
French male singer-songwriters